Calvert Street Station served railroad passengers of the Northern Central Railway in Baltimore, Maryland from 1850 until 1948. In this capacity, it served as the terminus for the second railway chartered in Maryland, which eventually was expanded into a network containing nearly 400 miles of track. The Northern Central, always in financial trouble, was leased by the Pennsylvania Railroad (PRR) after 1861. With the opening of nearby Pennsylvania Station, the terminal became redundant. Rail traffic ceased around 1948 and the station was razed in 1949 to make way for the current occupant of the space, The Baltimore Sun.

History
Calvert Street Station was constructed during 1849–1850 to serve as the southern terminus of the Baltimore & Susquehanna, and York & Maryland Railroad, at the intersection of North Calvert and East Franklin Streets in Baltimore, just south of the original terminus Bolton Station, located in Bolton Hill, which had opened in 1832. The Italianate station was designed by James Crawford Neilson (1816–1900), who notably designed several other buildings in and around Baltimore County. Although the tracks of the Baltimore and Susquehanna approached from the north, the train shed was built on a curve, allowing the station to front Calvert Street to the west. The station was completed in 1850, by which time the railroad reached as far north as Lemoyne, then called "Bridgeport". The railway was reconfigured as the Northern Central in 1854, and completed as far as Sunbury in 1858.

On February 23, 1861, Calvert Street Station was designated as an official stop of President-elect Abraham Lincoln's inauguration Whistle-Stop train ride from Springfield, Illinois, to Washington, DC. The track layout at the time meant that he would have to get off the train at Calvert Street Station and travel by foot or carriage to Camden Station, which was about a mile away. However, the Baltimore Plot to assassinate him was uncovered, and so special arrangements had to be made for Lincoln to travel in secret to avoid assassination. Lincoln himself had arrived earlier at 3:30 a.m. that morning into the President Street station thereby frustrating the attempted assassination.

In 1863, President Abraham Lincoln passed through Calvert Station on his way to deliver the Gettysburg Address. Two years later, after his assassination, his remains passed through the same station on their way back to Illinois.

In 1873 the NCRY, controlled by the PRR, opened Charles Street Station north of the terminal. Initially a stop en route, the PRR transformed the station into a connecting point for linking the NCRY the line with the route to Philadelphia. By the turn of the century, "Pennsylvania Station" was set for reconstruction, becoming "Union Station" at the completion of work. The new terminal, the nucleus of all Pennsylvania Railroad traffic into and out of Baltimore, superseded Calvert Street in significance. This redundancy was further compounded by the proximity of the two stations.

Passenger traffic continued to decline in the interwar period. The train shed at Calvert Street was removed after World War II, and the last train left the old terminal in 1948.

The property, by then vacant, was sold to the Baltimore Sun for the purposes of constructing their new headquarters and printing facility. 1949 saw the demolition of the remaining portion of the station. Today, no traces of the terminal or approaching tracks remain at Calvert Street.

References

Former railway stations in Maryland
Railway stations in the United States opened in 1850
Railway stations in the United States opened in 1948
Former Pennsylvania Railroad stations
Demolished buildings and structures in Baltimore
Railway stations in Baltimore